Institute of Mathematics of the National Academy of Sciences of Ukraine is a government-owned research institute in Ukraine that carries out basic research and trains highly qualified professionals in the field of mathematics. It was founded on 13 February 1934.

Notable research results
The perturbation theory of toroidal invariant manifolds of dynamical systems was developed here by academician M. M. Bogolyubov, Yu. O. Mitropolsky, academician of the NAS of Ukraine and the Russian Academy of Sciences, and A. M. Samoilenko, academician of the NAS of Ukraine. The theory's methods are used to investigate oscillation processes in broad classes of applied problems, in particular, the phenomena of passing through resonance and various bifurcations and synchronizations.

Sharkovsky's order theorem was devised by its author while he worked for the institute. It became the basis for the theory of one-dimensional dynamical systems that enabled the study of chaotic evolutions in deterministic systems, and, in particular, of ‘ideal turbulence’.

The school of the NAS academician Yu. M. Berezansky constructed the theory of generalized functions of infinitely many variables on the basis of spectral approach and operators of generalized translation.

The school of the NAS academician A. V. Skorokhod investigated a broad range of problems related to random processes and stochastic differential equations.

Heuristic methods of phase lumping of complex systems were validated, important results in queuing theory and reliability theory were obtained, and a series of limit theorems for semi-Markov processes were proved by V. S. Korolyuk, academician of the NAS of Ukraine. He has also constructed the Poisson approximation for stochastic homogeneous additive functional with semi-Markov switching.

Directors
 1934 — 1939 Dmitry Grave
 1939 — 1941 Mikhail Lavrentyev
 1941 — 1944 Yurii Pfeiffer, united institute of mathematics and physics
 1944 — 1948 Mikhail Lavrentyev
 1948 — 1955 Aleksandr Ishlinskiy
 1955 — 1958 Boris Gnedenko
 1958 — 1988 Yurii Mitropolskiy
 1988 — 2020 Anatoly Samoilenko
 2021 — Alexander Timokha

Scientific departments
 Algebra
 Analytical mechanics
 Applied researches
 Approximation theory
 Complex analysis and potential theory
 Differential equations and oscillation theory
 Dynamics and stability of multi-dimensional systems
 Fractal Analysis
 Functional Analysis
 Mathematical physics
 Nonlinear analysis
 Numerical mathematics
 Partial differential equations
 Theory of dynamical systems
 Theory of functions
 Theory of random processes
 Topology

Publications
The Institute publishes several scientific journals: 
 Methods of Functional Analysis and Topology
 Nonlinear Oscillations
 Symmetry, integrability and Geometry: Methods and Applications (SIGMA)
 Ukrainian Mathematical Journal

References

External links
 
 Official Facebook Page
 Page on Math-Net.Ru

 
Institutes of the National Academy of Sciences of Ukraine
Research institutes in the Soviet Union
Science and technology in Ukraine
Scientific organizations based in Ukraine
Research institutes in Kyiv
Mathematical institutes
Research institutes established in 1934
1934 establishments in the Soviet Union